Carpinus japonica, the Japanese hornbeam, is a hornbeam endemic to Japan but cultivated elsewhere as an ornamental.

The leaves are dark, glossy and slender, with 20-24 pairs of parallel sunken veins; every third tooth is whisker-tipped. The prominent catkins are green turning to brown.

This tree has gained the Royal Horticultural Society's Award of Garden Merit.

References

japonica
Endemic flora of Japan
Plants described in 1851